Louis Blancard (22 September 1831, Marseille – 27 October 1902, Marseille, aged 71) was a 19th-century French archivist and numismatist.

He was elected a member of the Académie de Marseille on 18 April 1861 of which he would be perpetual secretary from 1889 until his death in 1902.

Some works 
1861: Éloge de M. Gabriel Jourdan,... Discours de réception à l'Académie impériale de Marseille, prononcé... le 7 juillet 1861
1868: 
1884–85: Documents inédits sur le commerce de Marseille au Moyen Age : contrats commerciaux du XIII° siècle
1882: 
1896: De l'existence simultanée de Guillaume, marie d'Arsinde, et Guillaume, mari d'Adélaïde, comtes de Provence au Xe siècle

References

Bibliography 
 .
 .

External links 
 Louis Blancard on data.bnf.fr
 Notice on the site of the Académie de Marseille

École Nationale des Chartes alumni
French numismatists
French archivists
French palaeographers
Chevaliers of the Légion d'honneur
1831 births
Writers from Marseille
1902 deaths